Lyudmyla and Nadiia Kichenok were the defending champions, but they chose to compete at the 2018 BNP Paribas Open instead.

Anna Kalinskaya and Viktória Kužmová won the title after defeating Danka Kovinić and Wang Xinyu 6–4, 1–6, [10–7] in the final.

Seeds

Draw

Draw

References
Main Draw

Pingshan Open - Doubles
Pingshan Open